Parma F.C. youth teams (it. i giovanili) form the youth set-up of S.S.D. Parma Calcio 1913, comprising six squads divided by age group: Juniores, Allievi, Regionali, Prof B Esordienti, and Pulcini.

Juniores 

The Juniores are the Parma football team composed of footballers between 17 and 20 years old, which is the most senior youth category according to Italian football's hierarchy. Each season, the squad is trialled for promotion to the first team before the beginning of the season. Players deemed ready for first team football are registered.

The team has competed in the Italian Campionato Nazionale Primavera, which has been known as the Trofeo Giacinto Facchetti since 2006, but has never won the title. The squad has also competed in the Coppa Italia Primavera, the national Italian youth cup competition, but have also failed to win that competition Having won neither of the two Italian Primavera competitions, Parma have never competed in the Supercoppa Primavera.

The closest the team has come to a major honour was in the Torneo di Viareggio, a major youth tournament contested by teams from all over the world, succumbing to a 3–1 defeat at the hands of Brescia Calcio in 1996. Appearances in the third place play-off of that competition have ended in a 1988 win on penalties over A.C. Milan and a 1–0 defeat to Internazionale in 1989. The play-off was abolished in 2009, but Parma did manage a fourth semi-final appearance in 2012, losing 1–0 to Juventus F.C.

Staff
 Head coach: Simone Barone
 Assistant coach: Fabio Alimehmeti
 Goalkeeping coach: Luca Mondini
 Dirigente Accompagnatore: Andrea Piroli

Honours
 Torneo di Viareggio
 Runners-up (1): 1996
 Torneo Città di Vignola
 Winners (2): 2001, 2013

Primavera

Current squad
Updated 23 February 2016

Out on loan

Other youth teams
Below the Juniores, are the following youth teams:
Allievi (under 17s)
 League winners in 2003–04 and 2012–13
Regionali (under 14s) – Players born in 2002
Prof B (under 13s) – Players born in 2003
Esordienti (under 12s) – Players born in 2004
Pulcini (under 11s) – Players born in 2005

Notable former players
Many players from Parma's youth teams go on to have careers in professional football, whether at Parma or at other clubs. The following is a list of players who have played in Serie A.

 Ibrahim Babatunde
 Simone Barone
 Alessandro Bernardini
 Luca Bucci
 Gianluigi Buffon
 Ibrahima Camara
 Alberto Cerri
 Luca Cigarini
 Roberto Colacone
 Gianluca De Angelis
 Alfonso De Lucia
 Grégoire Defrel
 Daniele Dessena
 Gianluca Falsini
 Ivan Franceschini
 Niccolò Galli
 Marcello Gazzola
 Abel Gigli
 Pietro Lorenzini
 Carlalberto Ludi
 Matteo Mandorlini
 Leandro Martínez
 Alessandro Melli
 Vittorio Mero
 Francesco Montervino
 Nicola Mora
 Enrico Morello
 Federico Moretti
 Daniele Paponi
 Riccardo Pasi
 Stefano Pioli
 Filippo Porcari
 Aleksandar Prijović
 Alessandro Rosina
 Giuseppe Rossi
 Marco Rossi
 Francesco Ruopolo
 Filippo Savi
 Tonino Sorrentino
 Emiliano Tarana
 Roberto Vitiello
 Davide Zoboli

Footnotes and references

Youth teams
Parma